Derbe may refer to:

Derbe, a city in ancient Galatia
Derbe (Diocese), a former bishopric located at Derbe
Derbe (river), a river in the Russian Far East